Saône-et-Loire (Arpitan: Sona-et-Lêre) is a department in the Bourgogne-Franche-Comté region in France. It is named after the rivers Saône and Loire, between which it lies, in the country's central-eastern part.

Saône-et-Loire is Bourgogne-Franche-Comté's most populous department with a population of 551,493 as of 2019. It is also its southernmost department, as it is situated on the regional border with Auvergne-Rhône-Alpes. Saône-et-Loire's prefecture is Mâcon, with subprefectures in Autun, Chalon-sur-Saône, Charolles and Louhans. Its INSEE and postcode number is 71.

History
When it was formed during the French Revolution, as of March 4, 1790 in fulfillment of the law of December 22, 1789, the new department combined parts of the provinces of southern Burgundy and Bresse, uniting lands that had no previous common history nor political unity and which have no true geographical unity. Thus its history is that of Burgundy, and is especially to be found in the local histories of Autun, Mâcon, Chalon-sur-Saône, Charolles and Louhans.

Geography
Saône-et-Loire is the seventh largest department of France. It is part of the region Bourgogne-Franche-Comté. In the west, the department is composed of the hills of the Autunois, the region around Autun, in the southwest the Charollais, and the Mâconnais in the south.

In the centre, the department is traversed from north to south by the Saône in its wide plain; the Saône is a tributary of the River Rhône that joins it at Lyon and thus is connected to the Mediterranean Sea. The source of the Loire, is south of the department, in the department of Ardèche. It then makes its way in the opposite direction, forming the southwest border of the department, and eventually draining into the Atlantic Ocean. The Canal du Centre links the Saône to the Loire between Chalon-sur-Saône and Digoin, thereby linking the Mediterranean Sea to the Atlantic ocean. In the east, the department occupies the northern part of the plain of Bresse. In the west, its industrial heart is in Le Creusot and Montceau-les-Mines, formerly noted for their coal mines and metallurgy.

Principal towns

The most populous commune is Chalon-sur-Saône; the prefecture Mâcon is the second-most populous. As of 2019, there are 5 communes with more than 10,000 inhabitants:

Subdivisions
The department consists of five arrondissements:
Autun
Chalon-sur-Saône
Charolles
Louhans
Mâcon

There are 29 cantons in the department and 565 communes.

Demographics

Politics

The president of the Departmental Council is André Accary, elected in 2015.

Current National Assembly Representatives

Tourism

Touristic sites :
 Roche de Solutré,
 Abbaye de Cluny,
 Taizé and Taizé Community,
 Paray-le-Monial,
 La Clayette,
 Dompierre-les-Ormes (Galerie européenne de la forêt et du bois, Arboretum de Pézanin).

See also
Mâcon - Capital
Cantons of the Saône-et-Loire department
Communes of the Saône-et-Loire department
Arrondissements of the Saône-et-Loire department
Chizerots
Charolais-Brionnais region, known for its beef and its goats' cheese

References

External links
  Departmental Council website
  Prefecture website

  

 
1790 establishments in France
Departments of Bourgogne-Franche-Comté
States and territories established in 1790